Pointe de la Grande Journée is a mountain of Savoie, France. It lies in the Beaufortain Massif. It has an elevation of 2,460 metres above sea level.

Mountains of the Alps
Mountains of Savoie